A senior prank, also known as muck-up day in Australia and the United Kingdom, is a type of organized prank by the senior class of a school, college, or university. They are often carried out at or near the end of the academic year and are part of school traditions. While most senior pranks are harmless, more severe pranks can include damage to school property and other crimes, which can result in disciplinary or even legal repercussions against the perpetrators.

Common pranks

Common senior pranks include but are not limited to:

 Adopting unusual or fancy dress, especially at schools with strict uniform policies
 Using water pistols, stink bombs, water balloons, or shaving cream, on each other or on teachers
 Issuing fake announcements over the public address system
 Starting barbecues in unusual places 
 Imposing parking levies on the staff car park
 Issuing staff with detentions or uniform infringements
 Putting small polystyrene balls in the air conditioning, thus making it 'snow' in the building
 Chalk graffiti
 Filling elevators with hay or spreading bird seed in the staff parking lot to attract birds that then deconstruct the cars 
 Setting up tents and making it appear that the seniors had camped overnight on school grounds
 Having a party in a faculty/underclassmen parking lot to confuse the parking situation

Responses 
Incidents such as graffiti, vandalism or harming other students are dealt with in a number of ways, as the students despite finishing school have not yet graduated and, in the case of students enrolled in academic subjects, have yet to sit their exams. In extreme cases, or those involving non-students who turn up on the day, the police may be called. Some schools announce a day off for the rest of the school, while others conduct an assembly to formally farewell the final-year students during the day's events.

By region

United States 

The practice has been banned within some schools in the United States, and replaced with formal leaving activities to ensure students do not commit crimes or vandalise school or other property.

United Kingdom 
In the United Kingdom, muck-up days are common in private schools and state schools, and members of staff (particularly grounds staff and porters) often unofficially assist the perpetrators. Examples of such traditions include stealing the school's clocks as makeshift trophies or removing styluses for interactive whiteboards.

Australia 
In Australia, muck-up days are a common practice in many schools, although their nature has evolved over the years such that activities are usually pre-approved by staff (e.g., a year coordinator) and may not harm staff, students or property. At Scotch College in Perth, the Year 12 boys' valedictory dinner was cancelled by the school after some students vandalised and ran partially naked through two nearby girls' schools.

See also 
 Capping stunt
 Practical joke
 List of practical joke topics
 Skip Day
 Student prank

References 

Annual events in Australia
Prank
Traditions